The 2006 San Jose mayoral election was held on June 6 and November 7, 2006 to elect the Mayor of San Jose, California. It saw the election of Chuck Reed.

Incumbent mayor Ron Gonzales was term limited.

Because no candidate managed to receive a majority of the vote in the initial round of the election, a runoff election was held between the first round's top-two finishers.

Candidates
Advanced to runoff
Cindy Chavez, Vice mayor of San Jose since 2005 and San Jose city councilor since 1998
Chuck Reed, San Jose. City city councilor since 2000

Eliminated in first round
John Candeias
David Cortese, San Jose city councilor since 2000 and former member of the East Side Union High School District Board of Trustees (1992–2000)
Timmothy K. Fitzgerald
Larry Flores
Michael C Macarelli
David Pandori, deputy district attorney since 1998 and former San Jose city councilor (1991−1998)
Jose Aurelio Hernandez
Michael Mulcahy, realtor

Results

First round

References

San Jose
San Jose
2006